The Five is an American panel talk show on Fox News Channel in which full-time hosts Greg Gutfeld, Dana Perino, Jesse Watters, Jeanine Pirro and rotating hosts Jessica Tarlov, Geraldo Rivera and Harold Ford Jr. discuss current stories, political issues, and pop culture. The one-hour show premiered on July 11, 2011, and airs live weekdays from 5 p.m. ET (with a repeat of Friday's airing at 5 am. ET on Saturday mornings), unless breaking news coverage preempts.

Format
According to the initial Fox News press release announcing The Five, the show features a "roundtable ensemble of five rotating Fox personalities who [...] discuss, debate and at times debunk the hot news stories, controversies and issues of the day." In the video section of Fox News' website, it is promoted as "the hot topics that have everyone talking from the five voices that will have everyone listening."

Episodes typically begin with one of the hosts naming themselves and their fellow panelists, before reciting the show's opening catchphrase: "It's five o'clock in New York City, and this is The Five."

Former Fox News chairman Roger Ailes said the format for the show was inspired by chat-oriented programs such as The View; it has also been compared to the "Great American Panel" segment on Fox News' Hannity.

The show is made up of six blocks. Each of the first five blocks is introduced, closed and loosely moderated by a different co-host. The co-host's block may have a single topic or multiple topics. The final block is a brief wrap-up segment called "One More Thing."

Hosts

Current hosts
Primary
 Greg Gutfeld (2011–present): writer and host of Gutfeld!
 Dana Perino (2011–present): former White House Press Secretary and co-host of America's Newsroom
 Jesse Watters (2017–present): host of Jesse Watters Primetime
 Jeanine Pirro (2022–present): former prosecutor, district attorney and judge

5th/Liberal position (rotation)
 Jessica Tarlov (2022–present): Fox News contributor, Democratic strategist
 Harold Ford Jr. (2022–present): former U.S. Representative and Fox News contributor
 Geraldo Rivera (2022–present): Fox News correspondent

Former hosts
 Andrea Tantaros (2011–2014): In 2011, Tantaros was named a co-host of the hour-long, unscripted program, before going on to co-host Outnumbered in 2014. On April 25, 2016, she was placed off-air, indefinitely, for what Fox News said were "contract issues." In August of that year, Tantaros claimed that she approached Fox News executives about former Fox News executive Roger Ailes sexually harassing her in 2015. Tantaros said her allegations first resulted in her being demoted from The Five to Outnumbered, and then in her being taken off the air in April 2016 altogether. Additionally, Tantaros filed a sexual harassment lawsuit against Fox News that same month. Although Tantaros was still under contract with the cable network until early August 2017, she did not return to the Fox News airwaves.
 Eric Bolling (2011–2017): A show regular since the series' inception, Bolling announced on April 19, 2017, that he would be leaving to start work on a new afternoon talk show, The Fox News Specialists, which aired during The Fives former 5 p.m. time slot. He was replaced on The Five by Jesse Watters. In August 2017, Bolling was suspended from Fox News over sexual harassment allegations and was later fired. As a result, The Fox News Specialists was cancelled and the network announced that The Five would replace it at 5 pm.
 Bob Beckel (2011–2015, 2017): After not being seen on air since early 2015, it was reported that Beckel was recovering from back surgery. In April, Fox later released a statement informing viewers that Beckel entered a rehab facility for treatment of an addiction to prescription pain medication. Finally, on June 25, 2015, it was confirmed that Beckel had been fired from the network. While a Fox News spokesman initially stated that it was an amicable split, a Fox executive later stated that Fox "couldn't hold The Five hostage to one man's personal issues." On June 26, 2015, co-host Dana Perino briefly informed viewers of Beckel's departure with a terse statement at the end of the show; he was not mentioned on the show otherwise. Beckel returned as co-host of the Five in January 2017, but was fired again by May 2017, for allegedly making insensitive remarks to a black staffer at Fox and was replaced by Juan Williams. Beckel died on February 20, 2022.
 Kimberly Guilfoyle (2011–2018): Former Five panel member Guilfoyle left Fox News abruptly on July 20, 2018, to join the Trump campaign, Guilfoyle was later replaced by Jeanine Pirro four years later in 2022.
 Juan Williams (2011–2021): An original panelist from the show's inception, Williams announced on May 26, 2021, that he would be leaving the show to stay in Washington D.C. with his family while The Five resumed in-studio shows in New York City following the COVID-19 pandemic (Williams had been appearing remotely from his home in D.C. during the bulk of the pandemic). He remains with Fox News as a D.C.-based senior political analyst. Williams was replaced by rotating hosts Geraldo Rivera, Jessica Tarlov and Harold Ford Jr.

Reception
Reaction to the show among critics has been mostly positive, though the week it premiered, Alex Pareene, columnist for the website Salon, slammed it as "boring and lame" and "not even worth getting outraged about." Entertainment Weekly TV critic Ken Tucker dubbed the show his "favorite guilty pleasure" and praised its freewheeling style and zany humor, calling it "a delightfully nutty show with an undercurrent of ragin' crazy." Mediaite's Frances Martel, examining cable news' shift toward more personality-driven commentary, praised The Five for adding an element of entertainment to the news:

In 2014, The Daily Show with Jon Stewart echoed these sentiments when their "correspondent" Samantha Bee debuted her "one-woman show" about the supposed romantic subplot on The Five.

The show's loose and uncensored structure has led it into some minor controversies, particularly involving co-host Bob Beckel's on-air profanity and insensitive remarks. In August 2011, Beckel was forced to apologize on-air when, while trying to clarify an earlier remark wherein he called Michael Vick a "redneck," said the term was not racial, because "blacks are rednecks, whites are rednecks, I was a redneck, Chinamen are rednecks." Beckel was later compelled to apologize for using the term "Chinamen". The music the show's producers use to lead in and out of segments has also led to controversy, such as an incident in 2011 that prompted a Twitter war between Adam Levine and various Fox News personalities, over the producers' use of a song from Levine's band Maroon 5.

In April 2017, just two days after joining the show, co-host Jesse Watters came under scrutiny for a suggestive joke about the way Ivanka Trump was speaking into a microphone. The day after Watters made the comments, he announced that he would be "taking a vacation" for the remainder of the week amid calls for his firing.

Programming announcements and changes 
On October 3, 2011, after successful ratings and high popularity, Fox News announced that The Five would become a permanent series, as the program had previously been announced to last only during the summer.

In 2013, The Five was the second-most-watched program in all of cable news in the United States, placing only behind The O'Reilly Factor, also on the Fox News Channel. The program has occasionally been the number one rated cable news series in the key 25 to 54 viewing demographic.

Co-host Andrea Tantaros left the show in 2014 after she was named co-host of Outnumbered.

On February 27, 2017, the program was moved to Studio F with a graphics makeover.

On April 24, 2017, The Five moved to the 9 p.m. hour, following the cancellation of The O'Reilly Factor.

In May 2017, liberal co-host Bob Beckel was fired from Fox News due to racism allegations.

On September 25, 2017, The Five returned to its original 5 p.m. time slot to satisfy viewer preference.

In July 2018, founding co-host Kimberly Guilfoyle departed the program.

On May 26, 2021, the shows founding liberal co-host Juan Williams announced he would be leaving the program to stay with his family in Washington D.C. after the show returned to in studio production in NYC.

In January 2022, The Five announced Jeanine Pirro would be named co-host of the program along with rotating liberal co-hosts Geraldo Rivera, Jessica Tarlov and Harold Ford Jr.

Ratings
Initially airing as a replacement for Glenn Beck's program after his departure from the network, The Five debuted in July 2011 to modest ratings, but still handily won its time slot. The show gained broader success within weeks of airing, even rivaling Beck's former audience share on some afternoons. By late August, The Five was consistently beating its competitors on MSNBC and CNN combined and ranked among the top ten cable news shows. Additionally, the show proved to be more friendly to advertisers, who were previously reluctant to be associated with the controversial content of Beck's show.

The Five was the sixth-most-watched cable news program during the latter half of 2011 and the first quarter of 2012; it had jumped to fourth place by the third quarter of 2012, pulling in especially high numbers during the 2012 Republican Convention. The Five drew 4.4 million viewers on Election Day 2012.

By 2013, The Five was the second-most-watched program in all of cable news, placing behind The O'Reilly Factor, although the show was eclipsed on many nights by The Kelly File, which aired from 2013 to 2017.

In April 2022, The Five became the number one show on cable. Even out performing Tucker Carlson Tonight and the rest of Fox News' primetime lineup in the ratings.

By the end of the second quarter of 2022, The Five became the most watched show in cable news, beating every single Fox News, CNN and MSNBC primetime shows in the ratings with an average of 3.3 million viewers.

The Five closed out 2022 as the most watched non-primetime show in cable news history for an entire year. Averaging 3.5 million viewers.

Location
The Five is recorded live at 5 pm. ET from Studio M at 1211 Avenue of the Americas (also known as the News Corp. Building), New York City. On February 27, 2017, The Five relocated to Studio M from its original filming location in Studio D.

References

External links
 
 

2011 American television series debuts
American television talk shows
English-language television shows
Fox News original programming
Television Academy Honors winners